The Chery Arrizo 8 (艾瑞泽8) is a mid-size sedan produced by Chery.

Overview

The Arrizo 8 debuted in April 2022. It was launched on the Chinese auto market in September 2022 with prices ranging from 105,900 to 128,900 yuan.

References

External links
Official website

Arrizo 8
Front-wheel-drive vehicles
Mid-size cars
Sedans
Cars introduced in 2022
Cars of China